Adams is an unincorporated community  in Lake County, California.
It was formerly Adams Springs, a summer resort developed around a small group of mineral water springs.

Springs

The Adams Springs are beside Big Canyon Creek.
They are south of Seigler Mountain.
The springs are at an elevation of 2815 feet (858 m).
Along the steep slopes of the ravine the exposed rocks are sandstone and shale.
Higher up these sediments are covered by basaltic or andesitic lava.

A 1914 description stated, "The main spring is at the hotel, and is an alkaline carbon-dioxated water very pleasant to drink. There are also several other smaller springs. They have been bottling water from the main spring for the past twenty years. but only during the summer season. 
The spring water is alkaline, strongly carbonated, with a petroleum odor and taste.

Community

Adams is north of Hobergs and south of Loch Lomond.
It is bounded by the CA175 highway to the west, and by the Boggs Mountain Demonstration State Forest on the other three sides.
Adams Springs Golf Course is on the other side of CA 175 to the south of Adams.
The zip code for Adams is 95461.

History

The springs were discovered by Charles Adams in 1869.
He bought them in 1872. 
A small campground with tents was laid out near the springs.
William Robert Prather was the son of a successful self-taught dentist.
He completed dental school and qualified as a doctor.
Prather transformed the springs into a high quality health spa.

Development of the resort started in the late 19th century.
A large drain pipe was laid in the stream bed to carry off storm water, and the ravine was widened and levelled to make space for buildings.
Prather corresponded with Thomas Edison in the late 1890s, who told him how to build a Pelton wheel in Big Canyon Creek to generate electricity for the resort. 
Prather planted fruit trees, ran a farm and raised cattle where the Adams Springs Golf Course is today.
He added cabins and campsites around the spring, and advertised aggressively.

The resort became popular about 1900.
A post office operated at Adams from 1908 to 1960.
In 1910 the resort had a large frame hotel and several cottages and tents.
There was a swimming plunge on the hillside above the springs supplied by water piped from the stream.
Some people used the water for its medicinal value, but it was mainly a summer pleasure resort.
There was a well equipped hotel and a number of cottages, with accommodations for a total of 350 guests. 

In 1927 Prather erected a large new hotel on the edge of Big Canyon, with many windows, surrounded by a large covered deck.
In the period before World War II (1939–1945) the Merced Band would play dance music in the evenings to visitors who had motored up from San Francisco for the weekend.
Prather died in 1938 after his second son Clarence Prather had taken over management.
The new hotel caught fire and burned to the ground in 1943.  
After this Clarence Prather ran the resort at a loss for a few more years before breaking up and selling the property.
In the 1960s the remaining buildings were condemned and destroyed by burning.
What remained of the resort was destroyed in the Valley Fire of 2015.

Notes

References

Sources

 

Resorts in Lake County, California
Springs of Lake County, California